Ryszard Tadeusz Koncewicz (born 12 April 1911 in Lemberg; died 15 March 2001 in Warsaw) was a Polish soccer player as well as a coach. In the interbellum period, Koncewicz played without notable successes for Lechia Lwów (1927–1939). Caught by the Wehrmacht during the Polish September Campaign), he spent the war in a German POW camp Oflag IIC Woldenberg, where he represented the unofficial team of the city of Lwów, which consisted of POWs from there.

After the war he returned to Poland, and as Lwów was annexed by the Soviet Union, Koncewicz, together with numerous Poles expelled from the city, settled in Bytom, where he played in Polonia Bytom. In 1950 he became a coach of Ruch Chorzów, winning next year the Cup of Poland. Then he coached Polonia Bytom (1954 champions), Legia Warsaw (1956 champions and winners of Cup of Poland) and Gwardia Warszawa. 
 
As early as 1948, Koncewicz started cooperating with then-coach of Polish National Team, Wacław Kuchar, who himself was from Lwów as well. Then, he trained Poland for several short periods (1953, 1956–1957, 1964–1966 and 1968–1970). After retiring, he was an activist of the Polish Football Association (PZPN).

References

1911 births
2001 deaths
Polish footballers
Polonia Bytom players
Polish football managers
Lechia Gdańsk managers
Polonia Bytom managers
Legia Warsaw managers
Ruch Chorzów managers
Poland national football team managers
Sportspeople from Lviv
People from the Kingdom of Galicia and Lodomeria
Polish Austro-Hungarians
Association football forwards
Prisoners of Oflag II-C